Lord Sutch and Heavy Friends is the debut album of English rock singer Screaming Lord Sutch. Recording began in May 1969 at Mystic Studios in Hollywood and it was released on Cotillion Records in 1970. The album featured an all-star line-up with contributions from Led Zeppelin's Jimmy Page (who also produced the album) and John Bonham, guitarist Jeff Beck, session keyboardist Nicky Hopkins, session guitarist Deniel Edwards and Jimi Hendrix Experience bassist Noel Redding. Rick Brown and Carlo Little were previously with the Savages.

This album has also been released under the name Smoke and Fire. A CD release under the latter name appeared on the Magnum Music Group label sometime in the 1980s, evidently mastered from a vinyl copy of the original album. The cover credits Page, Beck, Bonham, Redding, and Hopkins; Sutch's name appears only in the personnel list, as David Sutch.

Track listing

Side one
"Wailing Sounds" (Jimmy Page, Sutch) – 2:38
"'Cause I Love You" (John Bonham, Deniel Edwards, Jimmy Page, Sutch) – 2:46
"Flashing Lights" (Jimmy Page, Sutch) – 3:14
"Gutty Guitar" (Sutch) – 2:33
"Would You Believe" (Jay Cee) – 3:20
"Smoke and Fire" (Sutch) – 2:38

Side two
"Thumping Beat" (Jimmy Page, Sutch) – 3:07
"Union Jack Car" (Jimmy Page, Sutch) – 3:03
"One for You, Baby" (Sutch) – 2:44
"L-O-N-D-O-N" (Sutch) – 2:56
"Brightest Light" (Jay Cee, Sutch) – 3:57
"Baby, Come Back" (Jimmy Page, Sutch) – 2:31

Personnel
Screaming Lord Sutch – lead vocals
Jimmy Page – acoustic and electric guitar (on tracks 1–3, 5, 7, 8, 11, 12), backing vocals, producer
Jeff Beck – electric guitar (on tracks 4, 5, 11)
John Bonham – Drums (on tracks 1–3, 7, 8, 11, 12), percussion, backing vocals
Nicky Hopkins – piano, keyboards (on tracks 4, 5, 11)
Kent Henry – guitar (on tracks 5, 6, 9–11)
Noel Redding – bass guitar (on tracks 7, 9–11)
Rick Brown – bass guitar (on tracks 4, 5, 11)
Deniel Edwards – lead guitar and bass guitar (1–3, 5, 6, 8, 11, 12)
Martin Kohl – bass guitar (on tracks 5, 6, 9–11)
Carlo Little – drums (on tracks 4–6)
Bob Metke – drums (on tracks 6, 9, 10)
Technical
Tommy Caccetta – engineer
Edgar Blackeney, Lord Sutch - album design
Baron Robbins - cover photography

Charts

Reception
Many of the musicians had grave misgivings upon its release. They were under the assumption these were demo-quality recordings. As a result, the artists disowned the project and the album sold poorly. It also seriously damaged Sutch's reputation with the musicians involved. "I just went down to have a laugh, playing some old rock 'n' roll, a bit of a send-up. The whole joke sort of reversed itself and became ugly," Jimmy Page said of the record.

A reviewer in Rolling Stone called Sutch "absolutely terrible" and lamented that the celebrated musicians involved were made to sound "like a fouled parody of themselves".

Lord Sutch and Heavy Friends was named in a 1998 BBC poll as the worst album of all time, a status it also held in Colin Larkin's All Time Top 1000 Albums 3rd Edition (2000).

Additional information
Catalogue: Atlantic 2400 008 (UK), Cotillion SD 9015 (US)

References

External links
 Lord Sutch & Heavy Friends Session Lord Sutch & Heavy Friends Session (Page / Bonham) | [title]

1970 debut albums
Cotillion Records albums
Screaming Lord Sutch albums
Albums produced by Jimmy Page
Atlantic Records albums
Albums produced by Screaming Lord Sutch
albums recorded at Olympic Sound Studios